Elgin is the name of some places in the U.S. state of South Carolina:
Elgin, Kershaw County, South Carolina
Elgin, Lancaster County, South Carolina